Scopula honestata is a moth of the  family Geometridae. It is found on Corsica and Sardinia and in Italy.

The wingspan is 20–25 mm for males and 25–27 mm for females.

References

Moths described in 1869
honestata
Moths of Europe
Taxa named by Paul Mabille